Van Campen Heilner was an American sportsman, and author of works on hunting and fishing. Heilner was born wealthy, his family's wealth, from coal mining, financing his expeditions hunting and fishing around the world.

Heilner's hunting and fishing companions included fellow authors like Ernest Hemingway and Zane Grey.  Both Hemingway and Grey provided forewords for some of Heilner's books.

In 1920, when he was 21 years old, Heilner became an editor and contributor to Field and Stream magazine.

Heilner was associated with the American Museum of Natural History.  His obituary in The New York Times describes Heilner forming the theory that most sharks were harmless, and then proving it by swimming with many species of sharks, without harm.

Heilner was a founder, and vice president of the International Game Fish Association.

On January 24, 1947, Heilner was staying overnight in the 173 year old mansion on historic Gardiners Island.  He was the sole occupant of the mansion, when it was swept by a devastating fire, that totally consumed the structure.  He barely escaped by jumping from a second floor window.

Bibliography

References

American sportsmen
American writers
1899 births
1970 deaths